The 1996 BOC Gases Australian Super Touring Championship was the fourth running of a touring car series in Australia under the Super Touring Car regulations.  It began on 19 May 1996 at Amaroo Park and ended on 9 November at Oran Park Raceway after sixteen races.

Teams and drivers
The following drivers competed in the 1996 Australian Super Touring Championship. 

 Note : Car 11 was entered as a Vauxhall Cavalier for the Mallala round. 
 Note : Car 25 was entered as a Holden Vectra for the Mallala round.

Results and standings

Race calendar
The 1996 Australian Super Touring Championship was contested over an eight-round series with two races per round.

Drivers Championship
Points were awarded 15–12–10–8–6–5–4–3–2–1 based on the top ten race positions in each race. An additional point was awarded to the fastest qualifier for each race.

Manufacturers Championship

Points were awarded on a 15–12–10–8–6–5–4–3–2–1 basis for relative placings achieved in each race by manufacturer supported entries. All cars other than the best placed supported entry of each manufacturer were ignored when awarding points.

Teams Championship

Points were awarded on a 15–12–10–8–6–5–4–3–2–1 basis for placings achieved in each race. Only the best two placed cars from each team were eligible to score points.

Toca Privateers Cup

Privateers Cup points were awarded on a 15–12–10–8–6–5–4–3–2–1 basis for relative positions achieved by drivers in entries nominated as privateers at each race.

The Privateers Cup was won by Steven Richards in his Garry Rogers Motorsport-entered Alfa Romeo 155TS and Honda Accord, scoring 161 points. Second was Cameron McLean, scoring 119 points, and third was Jim Richards, scoring 111 points.

See also
1996 Australian Touring Car season

References

 Auto Action (various 1996 editions)
  CAMS Manual of Motor Sport, 1996
  TOCA Australia 1996 Championship Results (27 November 1996)
  www.camsmanual.com.au

External links
 1996 Racing Results Archive
 1996 Australian Super Touring Championship – Entry List
 1996 images at autopics.com.au

Australian Super Touring Championship
Super Touring Car Championship